Anestis Afentoulidis (born 7 December 1941) is a Greek former professional footballer who played as a forward.

Career
Afentoulidis played at the youth level with Athletic Club Mesopotamia, and with Orestias Kastoria. In 1962, he played in the Association of Football Clubs of Kozani with Aris Kastoria, and assisted in securing promotion to the Beta Ethniki in his debut season. In the 1963–64 season he finished as the league's top goal scorer with 23 goals. In 1965, he played in the Alpha Ethniki with PAOK Throughout his tenure with PAOK he featured in the 1965–66 Inter-Cities Fairs Cup, and the 1967–68 Inter-Cities Fairs Cup.

In 1970, he returned to his former team under the new name Kastoria. The following season he finished as the Beta Ethnik's top goal scorer for the second time in his career. In 1973, he finished for the third time in his career as the league's top goal scorer with 20 goals. He assisted Kastoria in securing promotion to the Alpha Ethniki in the 1973–74 season. In the summer of 1973 he played abroad in the National Soccer League with Toronto Homer. He returned to play with Toronto Homer for the 1974 summer season.

References

Living people
1941 births
Association football forwards
Greek footballers
Greek expatriate footballers
Kastoria F.C. players
PAOK FC players
Super League Greece players
Canadian National Soccer League players
People from Kastoria (regional unit)
Greek expatriate sportspeople in Canada
Expatriate soccer players in Canada
Footballers from Western Macedonia